Senator Bedford may refer to:

Gunning Bedford Jr. (1747–1812), Delaware State Senate
Gunning Bedford Sr. (1742–1797), Delaware State Senate
Olivia Cajero Bedford, Arizona State Senate
Roger Bedford Jr. (born 1956), Alabama State Senate